"Push and Be Damned Rapids" is the evocative name for rapids on the Southwest Miramichi River, one of the many tributaries of the Miramichi River, New Brunswick, Canada, near the village of Juniper.

The name refers to the difficulty of "poling", or pushing a canoe upstream with a pole, on these particular rapids.

References

Landforms of York County, New Brunswick
Bodies of water of New Brunswick
Rapids of Canada